The Forty Years' War (1385 – 1424; also Ava-Pegu War or the Mon-Burmese War) was a military war fought between the Burmese-speaking Kingdom of Ava and the Mon-speaking Kingdom of Hanthawaddy. The war was fought during two separate periods: 1385 to 1391, and 1401 to 1424, interrupted by two truces of 1391–1401 and 1403–1408. It was fought primarily in today's Lower Burma and also in Upper Burma, Shan State, and Rakhine State. It ended in a stalemate, preserving the independence of Hanthawaddy, and effectively ending Ava's efforts to rebuild the erstwhile Pagan Kingdom.

First half
In the first phase, Swa Saw Ke of Ava began the hostilities by invading Pegu during the latter kingdom's dynastic succession struggles. The war began in some time between 1384 and 1386. Pegu's new young king Razadarit aided by able commanders Byat Za, Dein Mani-Yut, Lagun Ein and Emuntaya defeated Ava's multiple invasions. In 1391, Ava had to agree to a truce, which lasted until 1401.

Second half
The second half of the war was initiated by Pegu. To take advantage of Ava's dynastic succession crisis, Razadarit invaded Upper Burma in full force with a large flotilla in 1401. Ava's defenses held, and Razadarit and Minkhaung I of Ava agreed to another truce in 1403. The second truce lasted less than five years as Ava quickly went on an expansion spree, swallowing up the Shan states of Kale and Mohnyin in the north, and Arakan in the west, between 1404 and 1406. Pegu could not allow Ava to get too strong, and renewed the war. In 1408, Peguan forces dislodged Avan troops from Arakan. Pegu also found an ally in the Shan state of Theinni (Hsenwi), which too wanted to check Ava's ambitions.

Between 1408 and 1413, Ava was forced to fight on multiple fronts: Theinni in the north, and Pegu in the south and in the west (Arakan). Nonetheless, by 1412, Avan forces, led by Crown Prince Minye Kyawswa, had begun to gain an upper hand. Minye Kyawswa defeated Theinni and its Chinese allies in 1412. He invaded the Hanthawaddy country in full force in 1414, and conquered the Irrawaddy delta in 1415, forcing Razadarit to flee Pegu for Martaban. But Minye Kyawswa was killed in battle in March 1415.

End
After the death of Minye Kyawswa, the enthusiasm for war dissipated on both sides. Only three more campaigns (1416–1417, 1417–1418 and 1423–1424) were fought half-heartedly. In 1421–1422, two bitter rivals Minkhaung I and Razadarit died. The last campaign of the war came in November 1423 when Ava's new king Thihathu invaded the Hanthawaddy country during Hanthawaddy's succession struggles. Pegu's Crown Prince Binnya Ran I made peace with Ava by giving his elder sister Shin Sawbu to Thihathu. Ava forces withdrew in early 1424, ending the four-decade-long war.

Notes

References

Bibliography
 
 
 

Ava dynasty
Hanthawaddy dynasty
Wars involving Myanmar
14th-century conflicts
15th-century conflicts
14th century in Asia
15th century in Asia
1385 in Asia
1424 in Asia
Wars of succession involving the states and peoples of Asia
1385 establishments
1424 disestablishments